Thalapilly is one of the Taluks in Thrissur District of Kerala state, south India. Before AD 1860 the headquarters of the taluk was in Kunnamkulam. At present the headquarters of the Taluk is Wadakanchery. Kunnamkulam municipality, the Panchayats of Kandanassery, Kattakampal, Porkulam, Choondal, Chowannur, Kadavallur, Erumapetty, Velur, Thrissur, Mundathikode, Thekkumkara, Wadakkanchery, Mullurkara, Varavoor, Chelakkara, Pazhayannur, Thiruvilwamala, Panjal, Kondazhi, Vallathol Nagar and Desamangalam are in Thalapilly Taluk.

There are long chains of small hills throughout the Taluk while vast stretches of paddy fields and many Palmyra palms also feature in the landscape.

See also
Manalithara
Vadakkethara
Viruppakka

References

Thalapilly